Eliphalet Daniels (1713-1799) was a commander of Fort Sullivan, New Hampshire. He served under Timothy Bedel's Regiment of Continentals. In August 1776 he offered a two dollar reward for a drummer who went AWOL from his post.

History
In 1747 he appealed for government relief from the governor of the Province of New Hampshire after being wounded and imprisoned. He had been a lieutenant in the Canada expedition of 1746 when he was wounded and captured.

During the Revolutionary War era he commanded militia artillery troops at Fort Sullivan across from Titus Salter's command at Fort Washington on Peirce Island.

Heirs
Another Eliphalet Daniels (born April 12, 1797) - fathered Eliphalet Daniels (born Aug. 21, 1832)  - may have been his son or grandson.

References

1713 births
Date of birth unknown
Place of birth unknown
1799 deaths
Date of death unknown
Place of death unknown
Continental Army officers from New Hampshire
New Hampshire militiamen in the American Revolution